Novum is the twelfth and final studio album by Procol Harum, released on 21 April 2017. It is their first album in 14 years, and their only not to feature lyrics by Keith Reid.  It is also the last in Gary Brooker's lifetime.

Track listing
Music by Gary Brooker and Josh Phillips, except where noted. Lyrics by Pete Brown, except where noted.
"I Told On You" – 5:33
"Last Chance Motel" – 4:48
"Image of the Beast" (music: Brooker, Philips, Geoff Whitehorn) – 4:56
"Soldier" (lyrics: Brooker) – 5:28
"Don't Get Caught" – 5:12
"Neighbour" – 2:46
"Sunday Morning" – 5:28
"Businessman" – 4:45
"Can't Say That" – 7:13
"The Only One" – 6:10
"Somewhen" (music and lyrics: Brooker) – 3:47

Personnel
 Gary Brooker – piano, accordion, vocals 
 Josh Phillips – organ, vocals
 Geoff Whitehorn – guitar
 Matt Pegg – bass guitar
 Geoff Dunn – drums
 Pete Brown – lyrics
 Dennis Weinreich – producer

Charts

References

External links
 Official website for the album
 ProcolHarum.com - ProcolHarum.com's page on this album

Procol Harum albums
2017 albums
Eagle Rock Entertainment albums